Dirty Rotten Scoundrels: Original Broadway Cast Recording is the cast recording of the 2004 musical Dirty Rotten Scoundrels. It was produced by David Yazbek and Billy Strauss. Yazbek was also the lyricist and composer. This album was chosen as one of Amazon's Top 100 Editor's Picks of 2005.

Pre-release CD giveaway
On April 27, 2005, thousands stood in line at the Imperial Theatre to get free copies of the CD. Several members of the Broadway cast, as well as David Yazbek, were on hand to sign copies.

Track listing

Personnel

Cast
John Lithgow – Lawrence Jameson
Norbert Leo Butz – Freddy Benson
Sherie Rene Scott – Christine Colgate
Joanna Gleason – Muriel Eubanks
Gregory Jbara – Andre Thibault
Sara Gettelfinger – Jolene Oakes

Ensemble vocals
Timothy J. Alex
Andrew Asnes
Roxane Barlow
Stephen Campanella
Joe Cassidy
Julie Connors
Rachel de Benedet
Laura Marie Duncan
Sally Mae Dunn
Tom Galantich
Jason Gillman
Greg Graham
Amy Heggins
Grasan Kingsberry
Michael Paternostro
Rachelle Rak

Production
Howard Joines – music coordination
Jim Abbott – synthesizer programming

Musicians
Fred Lassen – conductor
Antoine Silverman – concertmaster
Michael Nicholas – violin, viola
Claire Chan – violin, viola
Cenovia Cummins – violin
Belinda Whitney – violin
Paul Woodiel – violin
Anja Wood – cello
Sarah Carter – cello
Andrew Sterman – reed 1 
Dan Willis – reed 2 
Mark Thrasher – 
Jim Hyne – trumpet 1 
Hollis "Bud" Burridge – trumpet 2 
Dave Stahl – trumpet 3 
Theresa Macdonnell – French horn
Mike Boschen – trombone, bass trombone
Dan Lipton – keyboard 1, piano
Jan Rosenberg – keyboard 2
Erik Dellapenna – acoustic guitar, electric guitar, archtop guitar, banjo, lap steel guitar
Mike Duclos – bass guitar
Dean Sharenow – drums
Howard Joines – percussion

Awards

References

External links
 DirtyRottenScoundrelsTheMusical.com
 GhostLightRecords.com

Cast recordings
2005 soundtrack albums
Theatre soundtracks